The following is a list of indefinite integrals (antiderivatives) of expressions involving the inverse hyperbolic functions. For a complete list of integral formulas, see lists of integrals.

 In all formulas the constant  is assumed to be nonzero, and  denotes the constant of integration.
 For each inverse hyperbolic integration formula below there is a corresponding formula in the list of integrals of inverse trigonometric functions.

Inverse hyperbolic sine integration formulas

Inverse hyperbolic cosine integration formulas

Inverse hyperbolic tangent integration formulas

Inverse hyperbolic cotangent integration formulas

Inverse hyperbolic secant integration formulas

Inverse hyperbolic cosecant integration formulas 

Area functions
Integrals of inverse hyperbolic functions